Albany Cross is a community in the Canadian province of Nova Scotia, located in Annapolis County. It is likely named for Albany, New York. Albany Community Church was dedicated in 1875 as a Baptist church and is now a municipally registered heritage building.

References

Communities in Annapolis County, Nova Scotia